Gottsche (or Göttsche) is a German surname. It may refer to:

Carl Christian Gottsche (1855–1909), German geologist
Carl Moritz Gottsche (1808–1892), German physician and bryologist
Lothar Göttsche (born 1961), Denmark-born German mathematician
Mark Gottsche (born ?), German Gaelic footballer